Vanchinadha Swamy temple is a Hindu temple dedicated to the deity Shiva, located in Srivanchiyam, Tiruvarur District, Tamil Nadu, India. Shiva is worshiped as Vanchinadha Swamy, and is represented by the lingam. His consort Parvati is depicted as Mangalambigai Amman. The presiding deity is revered in the 7th century Tamil Saiva canonical work, the Tevaram, written by Tamil saint poets known as the Nayanmars and classified as Paadal Petra Sthalam.

The tallest is the eastern tower, with 11 stories and a height of  The temple has numerous shrines, with those of Vanchinadhaswamy, Yama and Mangala Nayagi Amman being the most prominent. The temple has six daily rituals at various times from 6:00 a.m. to 9 p.m., and twelve yearly festivals on its calendar, with the Masi Magam festival celebrated during the Tamil month of Maasi (February - March) being the most prominent.

The present masonry structure was built during the Chola dynasty in the 11th century, while later expansions are attributed to Vijayanagar rulers of the Thanjavur Nayaks of the 16th century. The temple is maintained and administered by the Hindu Religious and Charitable Endowments Department of the Government of Tamil Nadu.

Legend

As per Hindu legend, once Lakshmi, the consort of Vishnu had a fight with him and left their abode, Vaikunta. She came to earth and Vishnu followed in search of her. He found a Linga (an iconic form of Shiva) in a Sandalwood forest and started worshipping Shiva. Shiva was pleased with the devotion and he restored Lakshmi to Vishnu. Since Vishnu helped Lakshmi, locally called "Sri", the place came to be known as Srivanchiyam.This story is not mentioned in puranas. As per another legend, a sage named Sarva was performing penance on the banks of river Sarayu. A divine voice told him that the Dharma would get destroyed during Kaliyuga. The sage was running towards the temple shouting "Shivaya Namaha, Thiruvanjiyam Abayam". Kali, another form of Yama was running behind the sage. He was stopped by Shiva on the border of the village. Shiva appeared as Vanchinathar to ward off the threat of Yama, who is stationed in a shrine outside the first precinct following the legend.

Architecture

The presiding deity of the temple is Shiva in the name of Vanchinathan and the  name of the Goddess is Mangalambika. The sthala vriksham (sacred tree of this temple) is Sandalwood tree. It is one of the shrines of the 275 Paadal Petra Sthalams. It is one of the rare temples where there is a separate shrine for Yama, the Hindu god of death. Yama is sported in seated posture with Chitragupta by his side. Gupta Ganga, Yama Theertham, Agni Theertham and Lakshmi Theertham are the various bodies of water associated with the temple. Masimagam is the most prominent festival in the temple when the festival image of Shiva is taken in the mount of Yama around the streets of Srivanchiyam. It has two nandhis facing both sides of Vanchinadha. Rahu-Ketu, carved out in a composite sculpture. There is a separate sannathi for Shani.

Thiruvayyaru, Mayiladuthurai, Thiruvidaimaruthur, Thiruvenkadu, Chayavanam and Srivanchiyam are considered equivalents of Kasi. Like in Kasi, where the city is centered around Kashi Vishwanath Temple, the temples in these towns along the banks of river Cauvery, namely Aiyarappar temple in Thiruvaiyaru, Mahalingeswarar temple in Thiruvidaimarudur, Mayuranathaswamy temple in Mayiladuthurai, Chayavaneswarar temple in Sayavanam, Swetharanyeswarar temple in Thiruvenkadu, Srivanchinadhaswamy temple in Srivanchiyam are the centerpieces of the towns.

Worship practices

The temple priests perform the puja (rituals) during festivals and on a daily basis. Like other Shiva temples of Tamil Nadu, the priests belong to the Shaiva community, a Brahmin sub-caste. The temple rituals are performed six times a day; Ushathkalam at 5:30 a.m., Kalasanthi at 8:00 a.m., Uchikalam at 10:00 a.m., Sayarakshai at 5:00 p.m., Irandamkalam at 7:00 p.m. and Ardha Jamam at 8:00 p.m. Each ritual comprises four steps: abhisheka (sacred bath), alangaram (decoration), naivethanam (food offering) and deepa aradanai (waving of lamps) for both Vanchinadha swamy and Mangala Nayagi. The worship is held amidst music with nagaswaram (pipe instrument) and tavil (percussion instrument), religious instructions in the Vedas (sacred texts) read by priests and prostration by worshippers in front of the temple mast. During the Tamil month of Kaarththigai (Nov-Dec), Theerthavari (sacred water splash) is conducted in the Guptha Gangai (temple tank) on all Sundays. It also includes a ten-day festival and a car festival at the end of the month.

Literary mention and religious importance
Appar, the 7th century Tamil saivite saint poet and nayanar has revered Kumbeswarar and the temple in his verses in Tevaram, compiled as the Fifth Tirumurai. As the temple is revered in Tevaram, it is classified as Paadal Petra Sthalam, one of the 276 temples that find mention in the Saiva canon. The temple is counted as the seventh in the list of temples in the southern banks of Cauvery. Appar has glorified the temple in nine poems referring the place as Kudamuku and the deity as "Kumbesar". The mention is found in the 59th poem in the Third Tirumurai by Sambandar and 22nd poem in the Fifth Tirumurai by Appar. This is a sacred tank in which goddess Ganga herself bathes to cleanse herself from the sins. A holy dip in this tank is equivalent to that of one in Kasi.

References

External links

Shiva temples in Tiruvarur district
Padal Petra Stalam